Al-Sabuni, Ismail bin Abdal-Rahman bin Ahmad bin Ismail bin Ibrahim bin Amir, Abu Uthman al-Sabuni al-Shafi'i also known as Abu Uthman al-Sabuni (373 - 449 AH / 983 - 1057 CE), was a Sunni polymath known for being the leading hadith expert in Khorasan, a jurist of great authority particularly in the Shafi'i school, a Qur'anic exegete, theologian, preacher, and orator. The Sunnis of his time called him the Shaykh al-Islām, and when they used this word they did not mean anyone else. He was eloquent in dialect, broad in knowledge, and was fluent in both Persian and Arabic. Al-Bayhaqi said: "He was the true Imam of the Muslims and the real Shaykh of Islam."

Biography
Al-Sabuni was born in the suburbs of Herat in the year 373 AH/983. He was an orphan when his father was killed and martyred for preaching the religion when he was nine years old. Al-Sabuni would be raised under the famous Imam and saint, Abu al-Tayyib Sahl al-Saluki, who would later attend Al-Sabuni's dhikr gatherings, and praise him for his piety, manners, intelligence, eloquence in the Arabic and Persian languages, strong memory and his deep knowledge of the Quran and Hadith, as did many of the other major scholars of his time such as Abu Ishaq al-Isfarayini and Ibn Furak.

Creed
Al-Sabuni was the student of Abu Muhammad al-Juwayni and was a famous propagator of the Ash'ari theology. He would be given special titles for refuting heresies by his respected contemporaries such as "Sword of the Sunnah" and "Repeller of Bid'ah (false innovation)" by Abd al-Ghafir al-Farsi and was given the title "Plague of the Deviants" by Abu Ishaq al-Isfarayini. 

Ibn al-Subki reports the Karramiyya from Herat were threatened by the extreme popularity and high status of Al-Sabuni in the region so they began to falsely attribute his name and title on a book authored by Abu Ismail Abdallah al-Asnari, the author of an anti-Ash'ari book 'Dhamm al-Kalam' against the Sunnis, with the same title Shayk al-Islam.

Works
Al-Sabuni authored plenty of books on different subjects but his most popular one is called The creed of the Pious Predecessors where he brings in narrations from the Salaf explaining their creed and the fundamentals of religion.

See also
 List of Ash'aris and Maturidis

References

983 births
1057 deaths
Asharis
Shafi'is
11th-century Muslim theologians
Sunni fiqh scholars
Persian Sunni Muslim scholars of Islam
Muhaddiths from Nishapur
Quranic exegesis scholars
11th-century jurists
11th-century Muslim scholars of Islam
Sunni Muslim scholars of Islam